Eupithecia emittens is a moth in the family Geometridae. It is found in Pakistan, India and Tajikistan.

The length of the forewings is 18–25 mm for males and 19–23 mm for females. The ground colour is brownish, or yellowish, or grey, with transverse stripes.

References

Moths described in 1996
emittens
Moths of Asia